The African Taekwondo Championships are the African senior taekwondo championships and held every two years by the African Taekwondo Union along with the South African Taekwondo Federation, both the continental affiliates of World Taekwondo. This is a recognized G-4 senior event by World Taekwondo.

List of tournaments 
All the listed editions of the tournament.

All time medal table
List of medal count by countries

References

 
Taekwondo competitions
Taekwondo
Taekwondo in Africa
Recurring sporting events established in 1996
Biennial sporting events